Maskwacis-Wetaskiwin is a provincial electoral district in Alberta, Canada. The district is one of 87 districts mandated to return a single member (MLA) to the Legislative Assembly of Alberta using the first past the post method of voting. It was contested for the first time in the 2019 Alberta general election and is represented by Rick Wilson of the United Conservative Party of Alberta.

Geography
The district is located south of Edmonton, named for the City of Wetaskiwin and the Hamlet of Maskwacis (which serves as a central community for the "four nations": the Cree Ermineskin, Samson, Montana and Louis Bull bands). It also includes the Pigeon Lake Reserve, which is shared by the four nations. Other towns and villages include Millet, Bittern Lake, Hay Lakes, and the summer villages that line the shores of Pigeon Lake.

History

The district was created in the 2017 electoral district re-distribution when most of Wetaskiwin-Camrose joined with parts of Battle River-Wainwright, Leduc-Beaumont, and Drayton Valley-Devon. The Commission decided to unite the five reserves around Maskwacis into a single riding to eliminate the province's last non-contiguous riding. The resulting population of the Maskwacis-Wetaskiwin electoral district for 2017 was 43,798, which was 6% below the provincial average of 46,803.

Electoral results

2019 general election

See also
List of Alberta provincial electoral districts

References

External links
Elections Alberta
The Legislative Assembly of Alberta

Alberta provincial electoral districts